John D. Idol (born 1958/1959) is an American businessman, and the chairman and CEO of Capri Holdings (formerly Michael Kors Holdings). He has been the CEO since 2003, and the chairman since 2011.

Career
Idol held senior positions at Ralph Lauren, before becoming the CEO of Donna Karan, a position he held from 1997 to 2001.

In 2003, Idol along with Hong Kong-based private equity firm Sportswear Holdings, bought the Michael Kors company for $100 million.

Idol owns only 1% of the company, having sold shares worth in excess of $400 million since the initial public offering (IPO).

In 2018 he was part of the consortium led by Lawrence Stroll in the purchase of Force India F1 Team. The team was pulled out of administration following the purchase and is currently named Aston Martin Cognizant F1 Team.

Personal life
In 2015, Idol bought a penthouse in the Palm Beach Biltmore in Palm Beach, Florida, for $7.4 million, previously owned by Pari-Sima Pahlavi, widow of Abdul Reza Pahlavi of Iran.

References

1950s births
Living people
American chief executives of fashion industry companies